The Federation of Rhodesia and Nyasaland was dissolved on December 31, 1963, and Malawi became a fully independent member of the Commonwealth of Nations on July 6, 1964.

The United States immediately recognized the new nation and moved to establish diplomatic relations. The U.S. embassy in Blantyre (later Zomba) was established July 6, 1964—independence day for Malawi—with David Young as current ambassador.

Ambassadors

Notes

See also
Malawi – United States relations
Foreign relations of Malawi
Ambassadors of the United States

References
United States Department of State: Background notes on Malawi

External links
 United States Department of State: Chiefs of Mission for Malawi
 United States Department of State: Malawi
 United States Embassy in Lilongwe

Malawi
Main
United States